Seyberts is an unincorporated community in Van Buren Township, LaGrange County, Indiana.

History
A post office was established as Seybert in 1889, and remained in operation until it was discontinued in 1914. Charles Seybert served as postmaster.

Geography

References

Unincorporated communities in LaGrange County, Indiana
Unincorporated communities in Indiana